The 1953 Drexel Dragons football team represented the Drexel Institute of Technology (renamed Drexel University in 1970) as an independent during the 1953 college football season.  Eddie Allen was the team's head coach.

Schedule

Roster

References

Drexel
Drexel Dragons football seasons
Drexel Dragons football